The 2A42 Cobra is an overhead-mount modular one-man gun turret designed by the ZTS Dubnica nad Váhom design bureau. It is specially designed to fit many different types of tracked and wheeled IFVs and APCs such as the  BMP-1, BMD-1, BTR-70, BTR-80 and the OT-64 SKOT.

Description 

The turret weights 1.05 tonnes without the equipment. The equipment provided for the turret meets modern combat requirements for protection of both the crew and the transported troops. It also allows accurate fire in all weather conditions, both by day and at night and while the vehicle is on the move. The turret is able to successfully operate in temperatures ranging from −30 °C up to +50 °C. The turret can turn through 360°, while the main gun and coaxial machine gun can be elevated or depressed between −4° and +50°.

The weapons with which the turret is armed are externally mounted. The interior of the turret provides complete electrical equipment for operating the weapons, ammunition magazines and a seat for the gunner. Controlling the weapons and moving the turret is accomplished by means of drive units with a manual duplicity if the electric system were to fail.

Armament consists of the 30mm 2A42 multi-purpose autocannon and the 7.62mm PKT coaxial machine gun with a 2-plane stabilization system. The weapons are controlled through the gunner's control panel. It is possible to integrate the anti-tank guided missile (ATGM), or antiaircraft guided missile (AAGM), depending on the customer's requirements. 

The turret is equipped with the modernized BPK-2-42 periscopic sight with a swing of the mirror from −5° up to +60°. The sighting system is equipped with a night vision device.

The turret control system enables the crew to check the function of individual systems, aim at a target by day and at night, control drive units of both traverse of the turret and elevation of the main gun, stabilize the position of the turret and the main gun, control mounted weapons and control elevation/traverse drives and weapons through emergency manual mode if the electrical system was to fail.

The turret is equipped with turret fiber-glass linings, internal overpressure and a filtro-ventilation unit as a means of nuclear, biological and chemical weapons (NBC) protection. The armor plating provides protection against bullets up to 14.5 mm caliber within the frontal arc and against bullets up to 7.62 mm caliber fired at any point on the turret. The turret is also equipped with six 81 mm 902V "Tucha" smoke grenade launchers fitted to both sides of the turret providing the vehicle with the ability to lay its own smoke screen.

References 

 ZTS Dubnica nad Váhom
 SVK - Veža 2A42 - COBRA / COBRA II (vežový komplet)

Remote weapon stations
Weapons of Slovakia